Sergey Tarasov or Sergei Tarasov may refer to:
 Sergei Tarasov (film director)
 Sergei Tarasov (biathlete)
 Sergey Tarasov (musician)
 Sergey Tarasov (snowboarder)